John Sebrie Watts (January 19, 1816 – June 11, 1876) was a Delegate from the Territory of New Mexico.

Born in Boone County, Kentucky, Watts moved to Indiana, where he completed preparatory studies. He graduated from Indiana University at Bloomington, whereafter he studied law and was admitted to the bar and practiced.
He served as member of the State house of representatives in 1846 and 1847.
He served as associate justice of the United States court in the Territory of New Mexico from 1851 to 1854, when he resigned, after which he resumed the practice of law.

Watts was elected as a Republican to the Thirty-seventh Congress (March 4, 1861 – March 3, 1863).
He served as delegate to the Republican National Convention in 1864, and took an active part in equipping troops for the Union Army during the Civil War.
He was appointed chief justice of the supreme court of New Mexico July 11, 1868, by President Andrew Johnson, and served in that capacity one year.
He resumed the practice of law in Santa Fe.
He returned to Bloomington, Indiana, where he died June 11, 1876, and was interred in Rose Hill Cemetery.

Sources

1816 births
1876 deaths
Members of the Indiana House of Representatives
Delegates to the United States House of Representatives from New Mexico Territory
New Mexico Territory judges
19th-century American politicians
New Mexico Republicans
Indiana Republicans
19th-century American judges